Little Sandy Correctional Complex is a minimum and medium/maximum-security prison located in Elliott County, near Sandy Hook, Kentucky.  The facility is operated by the Kentucky Department of Corrections. The prison is the most recently constructed state prison in Kentucky, having opened in 2005. The facility had a prison population of 1014 as of 2013.

History
Funds for a new prison was allocated in 1998 under Governor Paul E. Patton to expand jobs and relieve the overcrowding of Kentucky's prisons. December 2, 2001 Gov. Patton, and other public officials broke ground for an 895 bed medium security in Elliott County, Kentucky, on Kentucky 7 about five miles from Sandy Hook.

Notable inmates
Steve Nunn - Former member of the Kentucky House of Representatives and son of the late Kentucky Governor Louie B. Nunn. Convicted of aggravated murder in the death of his ex-fiancée. Sentenced to life imprisonment without the possibility of parole.

References

Buildings and structures in Elliott County, Kentucky
Prisons in Kentucky
2005 establishments in Kentucky